Heimir Björgúlfsson is an Icelandic artist born in Reykjavík, Iceland in 1975. Heimir lives and works in Los Angeles, California. He holds a BFA from the Gerrit Rietveld Academy and an MFA from the Sandberg Institute, both in Amsterdam, Netherlands. He also studied Sonology at the Royal Conservatory in The Hague, Netherlands.

Biography 

Björgúlfsson was born in Reykjavík, Iceland in 1975 and lived there until 1997 when he moved to The Hague, Netherlands to study Sonology at the Royal Conservatory of The Hague. In 1998 he moved to Amsterdam to study Fine Art at the Gerrit Rietveld Academy where he graduated with a bachelor's degree in 2001. He went on for postgraduate studies at the Sandberg Institute, also in Amsterdam, where he graduated with a master's degree in Fine Art in 2003.

Björgúlfsson has been exhibited in various solo and group exhibitions throughout Europe and the United States, such as The Living Art Museum, Reykjavík (2001 and 2003 solo); Kópavogur Art Museum, Kópavogur, Iceland (2002); Fries Museum, Leeuwarden, Netherlands (2001 and 2004 solo); W139, Amsterdam (2004 solo); Gemeente Museum, The Hague (2006); Reykjavík Art Museum, Reykjavík (2010); The Biennale for International Light Art, Ruhr, Germany (2010); Stenersen Museum, Oslo (2011); and Museum of Fine Arts, Houston (2012).

He was a founding member of the experimental music band Stilluppsteypa from 1992 until he left in 2002. During that time they produced 19 releases and toured both Europe and The United States, as well as appearing on 16 compilation releases. He also has 9 releases out both as solo and in collaboration with Jonas Ohlsson, as well as 13 compilation appearances. After that he was a member of the experimental improvisation band The Vacuum Boys who have 2 releases out to date.
He ran the record label FIRE.inc. from 1993 until 2003 and put out 24 releases by artists such as The Hafler Trio, Stilluppsteypa, Akira Yamamichi, Stock Hausen & Walkman, Vindva Mei, irr.app.(ext.), Skúli Sverrisson, Carl Michael von Hausswolff, Sigtryggur Berg Sigmarsson and Reptilicus.

Björgúlfsson has been featured in such publications as Tema Celeste, Artnet, Artweek, the Los Angeles Times, Houston Chronicle, Huffington Post, Temporary Art Review, ArtScene, Coagula Art Journal, ArtsHouston, The Houston Press, Metropolis M, The Wire, The Guardian, The Independent, De Volkskrant, Computer Arts and Morgunbladid.

Notes

External links 
 .
 Heimir Björgúlfsson at Bryan Miller Gallery
 Heimir Björgúlfsson at Barbara Seiler Galerie
 Heimir Björgúlfsson at Discogs.
 .
 The Vacuum Boys at Discogs.
 Stilluppsteypa at Discogs.
 FIRE.inc. at Discogs.

Further reading 

REVIEWS
 Sasha Dela "Main Street Galleries" Temporary Art Review, March 21, 2011.
 Douglas Britt "Heimir Björgúlfsson: Must-See Exhibit" Houston Chronicle 29-95, March 11, 2011.
 Kelly Klaasmeyer "Floating Stones: Heimir Björgúlfsson at CTRL Gallery" Houston Press, March 11, 2011.
 Mat Gleason "Heimir Björgúlfsson at Western Project", Huffington Post, July 14, 2010.
 Tracy Zollinger Turner "No End To It", Columbus Alive, June 24, 2010.
 "ARRAY" by Brandon Lamson, ArtsHouston, November 2007.
 "ARRAY" by Dusti Rhodes, Houston Press, 18 september 2007.
 "Range" by John O'Brien, ArtScene Vol 26. No 5 January 2007.

1975 births
Living people
Icelandic contemporary artists
Heimir Bjorgulfsson
Heimir Bjorgulfsson
Royal Conservatory of The Hague alumni